The National Emergency Medal is an award of the Australian honours system given for sustained service during a nationally significant emergency; or to other persons who rendered significant service in response to such emergencies. The medal was established by Queen Elizabeth II in October 2011. The medal is awarded for events specifically set out by regulation or may be awarded upon the recommendation of the National Emergency Medal Committee for significant service.

Description

The National Emergency Medal is a circular medal, ensigned with the Australian Coat of Arms. The obverse depicts a central image of a Golden Wattle branch. Surrounding the image at the edge is a further depiction of the flowering wattle. The centre of the reverse has the same border as the obverse, but in the centre it details by inscription the award and the recipient.

The National Emergency Medal ribbon colours match the colours of the Humanitarian Overseas Service Medal ribbon. The colours of the ribbon are gold and eucalyptus green. Gold symbolises the Australian sun, optimism and hope. Eucalyptus green complements the symbolism of the medal design. The seven gold coloured bands represent Australia’s six states, with the seventh representing the territories.

Clasps

VIC FIRES 09

Those who performed service during the Black Saturday bushfires and meet certain criteria are recognised with the "VIC FIRES 09" clasp.  Requirements include:

Service must be in the protection of lives and property, or in the service of interests, that are not their own, in direct response to the emergency, including support that enables or facilitates the emergency response;
The geographical area is the State of Victoria;
The qualifying period begins on 28 January 2009 and ends on 5 March 2009;
The minimum duration of service that a person is required to have completed to qualify is fourteen days in paid service, including at least two days in the period beginning on 7 February and ending on 14 February 2009.  For unpaid service the required length is seven days, including at least one day in the period beginning on 7 February and ending on 14 February 2009.

QLD 2010–11

Those who performed service during the Queensland Floods and Cyclone Yasi and met certain criteria are recognised by the "QLD 2010–11" clasp.  Requirements include:

Service must be in the protection of lives and property, or in the service of interests, that are not their own, in direct response to the emergency, including support that enables or facilitates the emergency response;
The geographical area is the State of Queensland;
The qualifying period begins on 21 December 2010 and ends on 14 February 2011;
The minimum duration of service that a person is required to have completed to qualify is twenty eight days of paid service or fourteen days of unpaid service.

TC DEBBIE 2017

Those who performed service during the Cyclone Debbie and met certain criteria are recognised by the "TC DEBBIE 2017" clasp.  Requirements include:

Service in the protection of lives and property; in the service of interests, the recipients own; in direct response to the emergency which includes support enabling or facilitating the emergency response;
Qualifying service must be in the geographical areas of Australia consisting of the following local government areas, as of 25 March 2017:

New South Wales: Ballina, Byron, Clarence Valley, Kyogle, Lismore, Richmond Valley, Tenterfield, Tweed.
Queensland: Banana, Brisbane, Bundaberg, Burdekin, Central Highlands, Charters Towers, Fraser Coast, Gladstone, Gold Coast City, Goondiwindi, Gympie, Hinchinbrook, Ipswich, Isaac, Livingstone, Lockyer Valley, Logan, Mackay, Maranoa, Moreton Bay, Noosa, North Burnett, Palm Island, Redland, Rockhampton, Scenic Rim, Somerset, South Burnett, Southern Downs, Sunshine Coast, Toowoomba, Townsville, Western Downs, Whitsunday, Woorabinda Aboriginal;

The qualifying period of service is from 25 March 2017  to 10 April 2017;
Persons must have served 5 days during the qualifying period of service to qualify for award of the medal.

NTH QLD 2019

Those who performed service during the 2019 Townsville flood and met certain criteria are recognised by the "NTH QLD 2019" clasp.  Requirements include:

Service in the protection of lives and property; in the service of interests, the recipients own; in direct response to the emergency which includes support enabling or facilitating the emergency response;
Qualifying service must be in the geographical areas of Australia consisting of the following local government areas, as of 25 March 2017:

Queensland: Aurukun, Barcoo, Boulia, Burdekin, Burke, Cairns, Carpentaria, Cassowary Coast, Charters Towers, Cloncurry, Cook, Croydon, Diamantina, Douglas, Etheridge, Flinders, Hinchinbrook, Hope Vale, Kowanyama River, Lockhart River, Longreach, Mackay, Mapoon, Mareeba, McKinlay, Mornington, Mount Isa, Napranum, Northern Peninsula, Palm Island, Pormpuraaw, Richmond, Torres, Torres Strait Island, Townsville, Whitsunday, Winton, Wujal Wujal, Yarrabah;

 The qualifying period of service is from 25 January 2019 to 14 February 2019;
Persons must have served 5 days during the qualifying period of service to qualify for award of the medal.

BUSHFIRES 19–20

Those who performed service during the 2019–20 Australian bushfire season and met certain criteria are recognised by the "BUSHFIRES 19–20" clasp.  Requirements include:

Service must be in the protection of lives and property; or in the service of interests, that are not their own; in direct response to the emergency (including support that enables or facilitates the emergency response);
Qualifying service must be in the geographical areas of Australia, in one of the nominated 108 local government areas in the States of New South Wales, Queensland, South Australia, and Victoria, and the Australian Capital Territory;
 The qualifying period of service, specifically stipulated for each of the 108 local government areas, a period between 6 September 2019 to 20 February 2020;
Persons must have served 5 days during the qualifying period of service to qualify for award of the medal.

Recipients

As of May 2014 the number of recipients listed in the Australian Honours database has increased. It is well known that this medal has been awarded in far greater numbers than this, however the roll has not been updated for reasons unknown. Some recipients do choose, for privacy reasons, not to have their details added to the roll.

As of June 30, 2013, 6,186 National Emergency Medals have been awarded, including 84 for Significant Service. Five people have been recognised for service in both the Queensland and Victorian emergencies.

Criticism

The criteria for award of the National Emergency Medal has been criticised as not honouring the efforts of many volunteers. Due to safety issues many volunteers were rotated out of disaster areas after a few days and unable to spend the required amount of time on the ground in the disaster area to qualify for the medal.

Lucy Kippist, writer at The Punch stated the Prime Minister after announcing the creation of the new medal "neglected to mention that most of the volunteers who served in those regions were completely ineligible for the award", with one reader described the award as "confusing, disorganised and grossly unfair way the National Emergency Medal was put together in the first place. Thousands of volunteers across the country also expected to be on that list".

See also

 Australian Honours System
 Australian Honours Order of Precedence
 2010–2011 Queensland Flood and Cyclone Citation

References

Civil awards and decorations of Australia
Military awards and decorations of Australia
2011 establishments in Australia
Awards established in 2011